Francis de Havilland Hall  (1847–1929) was an English physician, surgeon, and laryngologist.

After education at Bruce Castle School, Tottenham, Francis de Havilland Hall entered in 1866 St Bartholomew's Hospital Medical School (where he was a surgical assistant to James Paget). There, Hall qualified MRCS, LSA in 1868. He then graduated MB (Lond.) and in 1872 graduated MD (Lond.). From 1868 to 1878 he held house appointments at St Bartholomew's Hospital.

After a brief time in general practice, Hall became in 1875 a medical registrar at the Westminster Hospital. There he was, for about twenty years, assistant physician in charge of the throat department and became in 1896 full physician in 1896, retiring in 1912 as consulting physician. At the Westminster Hospital Medical School he lectured on the principles and practice of medicine.

In 1879 in Tunbridge Wells, he married Amy Margaret Smith. Upon his death in 1929 he was survived by his widow, one son, and three daughters, but his younger son died of wounds in WWI.

Awards and honours
1881 – elected FRCP
1903–1904 – presidency of the Medical Society of London
1913 – Lumleian Lecturer on Intrathoracic Aneurysm

Selected publications

References

1847 births
1929 deaths
19th-century English medical doctors
20th-century English medical doctors
Alumni of the Medical College of St Bartholomew's Hospital
Burials at Teddington Cemetery
Fellows of the Royal College of Physicians
People educated at Bruce Castle School
Physicians of the Westminster Hospital